The Nu-Klea Starlite was an electrically powered automobile built by the Nu-Klea Automobile Corporation from Lansing, Michigan, United States, from 1959 to 1960.  It was a  two-seater electrically powered vehicle.  It came with a plastic body with two motors driving the rear wheels.

References
 

Defunct motor vehicle manufacturers of the United States
Motor vehicle manufacturers based in Michigan
Vehicles built in Lansing, Michigan
Electric vehicles introduced in the 20th century
Cars of the United States
Cars introduced in 1959
Defunct manufacturing companies based in Michigan